Tjep Hoedemakers (born 27 July 1998) is a Dutch field hockey player who plays as a forward for Hoofdklasse club Rotterdam and the Dutch national team.

Career

Club hockey
In the Dutch Hoofdklasse, Hoedemakers plays for Rotterdam.

National teams

Under–21
In 2019, Hoedemakers made his debut for the national junior team during an eight-nations tournament in Madrid. He went on to represent the team at the EuroHockey Junior Championship in Valencia later that year, winning a bronze medal.

Oranje
Tjep Hoedemakers made his senior debut for the Oranje in 2021 during season three of the FIH Pro League.

He was officially named in the national senior squad in 2022.

References

External links
 
 

1999 births
Living people
Dutch male field hockey players
Male field hockey forwards
HC Rotterdam players
Men's Hoofdklasse Hockey players
2023 Men's FIH Hockey World Cup players
20th-century Dutch people
21st-century Dutch people